Amelia Mafi (born 22 June 1995) is a New Zealand rugby league footballer who plays as a  for the Sydney Roosters in the NRL Women's Premiership and the Wentworthville Magpies in the NSWRL Women's Premiership.

Background
Born in South Auckland, Mafi is of Tongan descent and played her junior rugby league for the Wentworthville Magpies.

Playing career
In 2018, Mafi played for Penrith Brothers in the NSWRL Women's Premiership. In 2019, she joined the Wentworthville Magpies.

In July 2019, she joined the Sydney Roosters NRL Women's Premiership team but did not play a game due to injury. In Round 3 of the 2020 NRLW season, she made her debut for the Roosters in a 24–16 loss to the Brisbane Broncos.

References

External links
Sydney Roosters profile

1995 births
Living people
New Zealand sportspeople of Tongan descent
New Zealand female rugby league players
Rugby league props
Sydney Roosters (NRLW) players